Count Charles Marie Tanneguy Duchâtel (19 February 1803, Paris – 5 November 1867, Paris) was a French politician.
He was Minister of the Interior in the Cabinet of François-Pierre Guizot (19 September 1847 to 24 February 1848), losing office in the February Revolution.

Sources
 Alfred-Auguste Cuvillier-Fleury, Le Comte Tanneguy Duchatel. Notice Historique, Paris, J. Claye, 1868
 Georges Picot, Le comte Duchâtel : notice historique, lue en séance publique le 12 décembre 1908 à l'Institut de France, Librairie Hachette, Paris, 1909 (read online)
 Notice biographique de Tanneguy Duchâtel, extrait de l'ouvrage Les ministres des Finances de la Révolution française au Second Empire, Comité pour l'histoire économique et financière de la France, 2007, 624 p,.
 Notice biographique sur le site de l'Assemblée nationale
 

1803 births
1867 deaths
Politicians from Paris
Orléanists
French Ministers of Finance
French Ministers of Commerce
French interior ministers
Members of the 2nd Chamber of Deputies of the July Monarchy
Members of the 3rd Chamber of Deputies of the July Monarchy
Members of the 4th Chamber of Deputies of the July Monarchy
Members of the 5th Chamber of Deputies of the July Monarchy
Members of the 6th Chamber of Deputies of the July Monarchy
Members of the 7th Chamber of Deputies of the July Monarchy
Members of the Académie des sciences morales et politiques